is a Japanese web manga series written and illustrated by Masaki Gotō. It was serialized on Shueisha's Shōnen Jump+ online platform from August 2017 to September 2019, with its chapters collected in eight tankōbon volumes.

Publication
Written and illustrated by Masaki Gotō, Mone-san no Majimesugiru Tsukiaikata was serialized on Shueisha's Shōnen Jump+ online platform from August 11, 2017, to September 13, 2019. Shueisha collected its chapters in eight tankōbon volumes, released from November 2, 2017, to October 4, 2019.

Volume list

References

External links
 

2017 webcomic debuts
Japanese webcomics
Romantic comedy anime and manga
Shōnen manga
Shueisha manga
Webcomics in print